Hygrocrates is a genus of  woodlouse hunting spiders that was first described by Christa L. Deeleman-Reinhold & P. R. Deeleman in 1988.

Species
 it contains five species:
Hygrocrates caucasicus Dunin, 1992 – Georgia
Hygrocrates deelemanus Kunt & Yağmur, 2011 – Turkey
Hygrocrates georgicus (Mcheidze, 1972) – Georgia
Hygrocrates kovblyuki Kunt & Marusik, 2013 – Turkey
Hygrocrates lycaoniae (Brignoli, 1978) (type) – Greece (Rhodes), Turkey

References

Araneomorphae genera
Dysderidae
Spiders of Asia